James Reynolds Roberts VC (1826 – 1 August 1859) was an English recipient of the Victoria Cross, the highest and most prestigious award for gallantry in the face of the enemy that can be awarded to British and Commonwealth forces.

Details
Roberts was about 31 years old, and a private in the 9th Lancers (The Queen's Royal), British Army during the Indian Mutiny when the following deed took place on 28 September 1857 at Bolandshahr, India for which he was awarded the Victoria Cross.

His Victoria Cross is displayed at the Regimental Museum of the 9th/12th Royal Lancers at The Strand, Derby, England.

References

Location of grave and VC medal (W. London)

1826 births
1859 deaths
9th Queen's Royal Lancers soldiers
British recipients of the Victoria Cross
Indian Rebellion of 1857 recipients of the Victoria Cross
People from Bow, London
British Army recipients of the Victoria Cross